Tall ironweed is a common name for several plants and may refer to:

Vernonia angustifolia, native to the southeastern United States
Vernonia gigantea, native to eastern North America